Pseudaraeococcus parviflorus is a species of flowering plant in the family Bromeliaceae, endemic to Brazil (state of Bahia). It was first described in 1830 as Billbergia parviflora.

References

Bromelioideae
Endemic flora of Brazil
Flora of the Atlantic Forest
Flora of Bahia
Plants described in 1830